Das Ist Alles is a collaborative album by Peter Frohmader and Michael Fuchs-Gamböck, released independently in 2000.

Track listing

Personnel 
Adapted from the Das Ist Alles liner notes.
 Peter Frohmader – synthesizer, sampler, guitar
 Michael Fuchs-Gamböck – spoken word
 Sabine Grillenbeck – vocals (1)
 Holger Röder – drums (5)

Release history

References 

2000 albums
Collaborative albums
Peter Frohmader albums